The Signs Gospel or the semeia source is a hypothetical gospel account of the life of Jesus Christ which some scholars have suggested could have been a primary source document for the Gospel of John. This theory has its basis in source criticism. Since the commentary of Rudolf Bultmann was published in 1941, the hypothesis of a semeia (sign or miracle) source has gained some acceptance.

Internal evidence 
One possible construction of the "internal evidence" states that the Beloved Disciple wrote an account of the life of Jesus. However, this disciple died unexpectedly, necessitating that a revised gospel be written. In other words, it may be that John “is the source" of the Johannine tradition but "not the final writer of the tradition."
 Therefore, scholars are no longer looking for the identity of a single writer but for numerous authors whose authorship has been absorbed into the gospel's development over a period of time and in several stages.

Bultmann 
The hypothesis of the Gospel of John being composed in layers over a period of time originated in the work of Rudolf Bultmann in 1941. Bultmann suggested that the author(s) of John depended in part on an author who wrote an earlier account. This hypothetical "Signs Gospel" listing Christ's miracles was independent of, and not used by, the synoptic gospels. It was believed to have been circulating before the year 70 AD. Bultmann's conclusion was so controversial that heresy proceedings were instituted against him and his writings.

Later scholarship 
Nevertheless, this hypothesis has not disappeared. Scholars such as Raymond E. Brown believe the original author of the Signs Gospel to be the Beloved Disciple. They argue that the disciple who formed this community was both a historical person and a companion of Jesus Christ. Brown also suggests that the Beloved Disciple had been a follower of John the Baptist before joining Jesus.

It is now widely agreed that the Gospel of John draws upon a tradition of Miracles of Jesus which is substantially independent of the three synoptic gospels.

Robert T. Fortna 
Robert Fortna, a member of the Jesus Seminar, argued that there are at least two distinct writing styles contained in the Gospel of John. The later style contains highly developed and sophisticated midrash and theological essays attached superficially - even "mechanically" at some points - to the former source. The other - earlier - style is the original 2-part Signs Gospel, consisting of a Signs Source (SQ) and a Passion Source (PQ). It is simple, direct and historical in style and can be roughly reconstructed as follows:

John the Baptist (1:6-7,19-49)
Water into wine (2:1-11)
Official's son healed (2:12a,4:46b-54)
Catch of 153 fish (21:1-14)
Feeding 5000 (6:1-14)
Walking on water (6:15-25)
Raising of Lazarus (11:1-45)
Blind man given sight (9:1-8)
Healing at the Pool of Bethesda (5:2-9)
Plot to kill Jesus (11:47-53)
Temple incident (2:14-19)
Jewish rejection (12:37-40)
Mary anoints Jesus (12:1-8)
Entering Jerusalem (12:12-15)
Arrest (18:1-11)
Before the High Priest (18:12-27)
Before Pilate (18:28-19:16a)
Crucifixion (19:16b-37)
Joseph of Arimathea (19:38-42)
Empty tomb (20:1-10)
Do not hold on to me (20:11-18)
Great Commission (20:19-22)
Conclusion (20:30-31ab)

See also
 List of Gospels

References

External links
Text of the Signs Gospel

Biblical criticism
Hypothetical documents
Johannine literature